The red-billed partridge (Arborophila rubrirostris) is a bird species in the family Phasianidae. It is endemic to the Basiran highland forest in Sumatra, Indonesia. It is the only member of the genus Arborophila where the bill is completely red (others have either a yellow-tipped red bill or a black bill).

References

red-billed partridge
Birds of Sumatra
red-billed partridge
Taxonomy articles created by Polbot